Club Deportivo Cuarte is a Spanish football team based in Cuarte de Huerva, in the autonomous community of Aragon. Founded in 1969, it plays in Tercera División - Group 17, holding home games at Nuevo Estadio Municipal de Cuarte de Huerva, with a capacity of 1,000 spectators. 

For 2012–13 season, the club dropped "Industrial" word from its official name, being the new CD Cuarte.

Season to season

10 seasons in Tercera División

References

External links
Official website 

Football clubs in Aragon
Association football clubs established in 1969
1969 establishments in Spain